Kareena Kareena is a Zee TV comedy serial that aired from 18 October 2004 to 17 October 2005. Numerous celebrities have also made appearances on the show such as Amol Palekar, Abhishek Bachchan, Shahrukh Khan, Priyanka Chopra, and Rajeev Khandelwal. A  spin off Pandey aur Pandey aired in 2006. The show was replaced by Saat Phere: Saloni Ka Safar Reruns of the show aired on Zee Smile and Zee Anmol.

Cast
 Kulraj Randhawa as Kareena/Mrs. Sood
 Nandita Puri as Kareena's Mother
 Sandeep Rajora as Tushar Pandey
 Sharokh Barocha as Prem Motwani
 Sudhir Pandey as Tribhuvandas Pandey
 Vandana Gupte as Nilambari Tribhuvandas Pandey
 Atul Srivastava as P.K. Srivastav
 Manmeet Singh as Kareena's landlord
 Neeru Bajwa as Lolo
 Karanveer Singh as Kareena's Boyfriend
 Manisha Kanojia as Lolo's Mother
 Anju Rajeev
 Faraaz Khan

References

Indian comedy television series
Zee TV original programming
2004 Indian television series debuts
2005 Indian television series endings